Mayang Imphal (Vidhan Sabha constituency) is one of the 60 constituencies in the Manipur Legislative Assembly of Manipur, a north-eastern state of India. Mayang Imphal is also part of Inner Manipur Lok Sabha constituency.

Members of Legislative Assembly

Election results

2017

See also
 Mayang Imphal
 Imphal West district
 List of constituencies of Manipur Legislative Assembly

References

External links
 

Assembly constituencies of Manipur
Imphal West district